The Itaueira River is a river of Piauí state in northeastern Brazil, a tributary of the Parnaíba River.

The river, which is intermittent, rises in the  Serra das Confusões National Park, created in 1998, which protects an area of the Caatinga biome.

See also
List of rivers of Piauí

References

Brazilian Ministry of Transport

Rivers of Piauí